The 2021 Korean FA Cup, known as Hana Bank FA Cup due to sponsorship agreement with Hana Bank, was the 26th edition of the Korean FA Cup. Similar to the previous year, U-League teams did not participate, and the top ten sides from the K5 League gained qualification instead.

Jeonbuk Hyundai Motors were the defending champions, but were defeated by Yangju Citizen FC in the round of 16.

Jeonnam Dragons defeated Daegu FC in the final on the away goals rule (4–4 on aggregate) to win their fourth cup title. As winners, they qualified for the 2022 AFC Champions League Group stage.

Calendar

First round
The draw was held on 4 February 2021.

Second round

Third round

Round of 16

Quarter-finals
The draw was held on 14 June 2021.

Semi-finals

Final

Jeonnam Dragons won on the away goals rule.

References

External links
 Official FA Cup Page at KFA Website
 Korean FA Cup, Soccerway.com
 Operation Rule (Archived)

Korean FA Cup seasons
Korea, South